Majlishpur is one of the 60 Legislative Assembly constituencies of Tripura state in India. It is in West Tripura district and is a part of Tripura West Lok Sabha constituency.

Members of Legislative Assembly

 1972: Khagen Das, Communist Party of India (Marxist)
 1977: Khagen Das, Communist Party of India (Marxist)
 1983: Dipak Nag, Indian National Congress
 1988: Dipak Nag, Indian National Congress
 1993: Manik Dey, Communist Party of India (Marxist)
 1998: Manik Dey, Communist Party of India (Marxist)
 2003: Manik Dey, Communist Party of India (Marxist)
 2008: Manik Dey, Communist Party of India (Marxist)
 2013: Manik Dey, Communist Party of India (Marxist)

Election results

2018

2013 election

See also
List of constituencies of the Tripura Legislative Assembly
 West Tripura district
 Tripura West (Lok Sabha constituency)

References

West Tripura district
Assembly constituencies of Tripura